Levenstein, Levenshtein is a surname. Notable people with the surname include:
 Jim Levenstein, a fictional character in the American Pie film series
 Matvey Levenstein (born 1960), Russian-American painter
 Vladimir Levenshtein (1935-2017), Russian scientist
 Levenshtein distance, a metric for comparing two strings or words
 Levenshtein coding, a binary number coding
 Yechezkel Levenstein, Mashgiach in the Yeshivas Mir and in Ponovezh, known as Reb Chatzkel

See also
 Löwenstein (disambiguation)

Jewish surnames
Levite surnames
Yiddish-language surnames